Reginald Davies (30 September 1897 – 7 January 1977) was an English professional footballer who made over 330 appearances in the Football League for Portsmouth, Brentford and Mansfield Town as a wing half.

Career

Early years 
A wing half, Davies began his career in non-League football with local club Sutton Town.

Portsmouth 
Davies began his league career at Third Division South club Portsmouth in July 1922 and captained the team which rose from the basement to First Division in four seasons. He departed Fratton Park at the end of the 1927–28 season, after making 216 appearances and scoring three goals for Pompey.

Brentford 
Aged almost 30, Davies dropped back down to the Third Division South to sign for Brentford during the 1928 off-season for a £250 fee. Despite his age, he was a virtual ever-present for the team at wing half and played in all 42 league games of the 1929–30 season, when the Bees won all 21 home games at Griffin Park to set a record which has never been equalled. He dropped down into the reserves in 1931 and helped the team win the 1931–32 London Combination. Davies left the Bees at the end of the 1931–32 season and made 123 appearances for the club.

Later years 
Davies returned to his native Nottinghamshire and played for Third Division North club Mansfield Town during the 1932–33 season, before ending his career back in non-League football with Rufford Colliery.

Career statistics

Honours 
Portsmouth
Football League Second Division second-place promotion: 1926–27
Football League Third Division South: 1923–24
Brentford Reserves
 London Combination: 1931–32

References

People from Stanton Hill
Footballers from Nottinghamshire
English footballers
Brentford F.C. players
English Football League players
1897 births
Portsmouth F.C. players
Association football wing halves
Mansfield Town F.C. players
Ashfield United F.C. players
1977 deaths